The Catholic Church in Iran is part of the worldwide Catholic Church, under the spiritual leadership of the Pope in Rome. There are about 21,380 Catholics in Iran out of a total population of about 78.9 million. They are part of the Armenian Catholic Church, Chaldean Catholic Church and Latin Church. Aside from some Iranian citizens, Catholics include foreigners in Iran like Spanish-speaking people (Latin Americans and Spanish), and other Europeans.

Dioceses and Eparchies 
 Armenian Catholic Eparchy of Ispahan/Esfáan
 Chaldean Catholic Archdiocese of Tehran/Teheran
 Chaldean Catholic Archdiocese of Urmyā/Rezayeh/Urmia
 Chaldean Catholic Archeparchy of Ahvaz/Ahwaz
 Chaldean Catholic Diocese of Salmas/Shahpour
 Roman Catholic Archdiocese of Teheran-Isfahan

Cathedrals
See also List of Catholic churches in Tehran and List of Catholic dioceses in Iran

 Cathedral of Our Lady of the Rosary in New Julfa, Iran (Roman Catholic Archdiocese of Isfahan)
 Cathedral of the Consolata in Tehran, Iran (Roman Catholic Archdiocese of Isfahan)
 Cathedral of St. Joseph in Tehran, Iran (Chaldean Catholic Metropolitan Archdiocese of Tehran)
 Cathedral of St. Lazarus (Roman Catholic Archdiocese of Isfahan)
 Cathedral of St. Mary the Mother of God in Urmia, Iran (Chaldean Catholic Metropolitan Archdiocese of Urmyā)

Diplomatic relations
In October 2010, an Iranian official delivered a letter from President Ahmadinejad to Pope Benedict XVI in which the President said he hoped to work closely with the Holy See to help stem religious intolerance, the breakup of families and the increase of secularism and materialism. A return letter from Pope Benedict was hand-delivered by Jean-Louis Cardinal Tauran, president of the Pontifical Council for Interreligious Dialogue, according to Passionist Father Reverend Ciro Benedettini, vice-director of the Vatican Press Office in a statement issued November 10, 2010. The papal letter's contents were not disclosed. Cardinal Tauran met with the Iranian leader while Tauran was participating in a three-day meeting on Islamic–Christian relations, along with Iranian Catholic leaders. The meeting was a joint initiative of the Pontifical Council for Interreligious Dialogue and the Teheran-based Islamic Culture and Relations Organization.

Related pages
 Holy See–Iran relations
 List of Persian saints

References
 GCatholic.org
 Catholic Hierarchy website

 
Iran